Olivier Enjolras is a French former footballer who spent several seasons with Clermont Foot.

References

1971 births
Living people
Clermont Foot players
Association football goalkeepers
Moulins Yzeure Foot players
French footballers